The Antigua River is a river of Mexico. It has an area of 108 square miles.

See also
List of rivers of Mexico

References

The Prentice Hall American World Atlas, 1984.
Rand McNally, The New International Atlas, 1993.

Rivers of Mexico
Rivers of Veracruz
Drainage basins of the Gulf of Mexico